Olga Rajković (born 13 April 1913, date of death unknown) was a Yugoslav gymnast. She competed in the women's artistic team all-around event at the 1936 Summer Olympics.

References

1913 births
Year of death missing
Yugoslav female artistic gymnasts
Olympic gymnasts of Yugoslavia
Gymnasts at the 1936 Summer Olympics
Place of birth missing